Vyacheslav Nikolaevich Borisov (: January 12, 1955 – November 4, 2021) was a Russian major-general. He took part in the 2008 Russo-Georgian War as a commanding officer in South Ossetia. The International Criminal Court (ICC) collected evidence against Borisov, who, according to a ICC prosecutor, was "believed to have intentionally contributed to the execution" of war crimes against Georgian civilians, but Borisov died before the ICC investigation was concluded.

Early life and career
Borisov was born in Ruza, near Moscow, during the rule of the Soviet Union. He graduated from the Sverdlovsk Suvorov Military School. He joined the Soviet Military in 1976, when he graduated from the Ryazan Higher Airborne College and was commissioned into the airborne forces. A good officer, he rose through the ranks and in 1990 he graduated from the elite M. V. Frunze Military Academy. From 1991-1995, he was commander of the 11th Separate Airborne Brigade in Ulan-Ude, the Transbaikal Military District. Later after promotion to General officer rank, he commanded the 2nd Motor Rifle Division in the Moscow Military District.

Commands in Georgia
In 1998, he graduated from the General Staff Academy and was appointed the commander of the 12th Russian Military Base in Batumi, Georgia's Autonomous Republic of Adjara. In 2003, he became Deputy Commander for Airborne Training. Sometime before 2008, he became commander of the 76th Airborne Division, and he would lead this into war.

2008 South Ossetian War
As a division commander, his division was sent from its garrison in Pskov to reinforce 58th Army, and took part in the Battle of Tskhinvali. After the successful conclusion of the battle, his force moved further and occupied Gori. He was the commander of Russian military forces during the occupation of Gori. In the absence of civilian government, he was the de facto governor in the region.

On 6 June 2009, Borisov in an interview with Moscow-based radio Ekho Moskvy said that the reason why his division performed well in the 2008 South Ossetia War was that "a week before the war they held military exercises exactly there, in those places". In December 2022, the International Criminal Court investigation uncovered Borisov's role in war crimes committed during the hostilities, but no warrant was issued as he had died in November 2021.

Personal life
General Borisov was married and had two sons. He was also a Christian.

Military medals and ribbons

References

External links
Picture of the General in Gori.
Biography of the General on Federation of American Scientists

Military personnel of the Russo-Georgian War
Russian major generals
1955 births
Living people
Frunze Military Academy alumni